Osleston and Thurvaston is a civil parish in Derbyshire, England. The parish includes Longlane, Osleston and Thurvaston. As of 2020, it has a population of 263.

History 
Osleston and Thurvaston was formerly a township in the parish of Sutton-on-the-Hill. In 1866, Osleston and Thurvaston became a civil parish in its own right. On 18 August 1882, part of Sutton-on-the-Hill was transferred to Osleston and Thurvaston.

See also
Listed buildings in Osleston and Thurvaston

References

Civil parishes in Derbyshire
South Derbyshire District